The following were among the mayors of Faversham, Kent, England:

Pre 21st Century 

1438 Simonis Orwell
1465 Willelmus Norton
1480 Edward Thomasson [Thompson]
1535 Richard Colwell
1550: Thomas Arden, who was murdered by his wife, Alice Arden, and her lover, the subject of the play Arden of Faversham
1580: Richard Tylman, mayor, became Faversham's leading corn, wheat and malt exporter to London.
1588 John Castlock Sr
1598 Anthony Deale
1603 John Castlock Sr
1605 John Haywarde
1612 John Caslocke Jr
1619 John Besbeech
1621 Thomas Napleton
1624 Samuel Hayward
1628 John Caslocke Jr
1629 John Besbeech
1650 John Shevren (Sherren)
1650/1651 William Hills (died in office March 26th 1651) 
1655 John Shevren (Sherren)
1657 Edward Spillett
1674 Marke Trouts
1677 Stephen Blanket
1683 Stephen Blanket
1691 William Day
1693 Isaac Terry
1697 Thomas Gibbs
1700 John Bateman
1703 Isaac Terry
1704 Thomas Gibbs
1706 John Seere
1707 John Bateman
1708 Richard Marsh, founder of Shepherd Neame Brewery
1710 Thomas Gibbs
1712 Isaac Terry
1713 Michael Jones
1715 Thomas Gibbs
1716 John Seere
1719 John Bateman
1723 1saac Jones (son of Mayor Michael Jones)
1724 John Bateman (died in office on June 2nd 1725)
1726 John Seere
1732 John Watson
1735 Isaac Jones
1737 John Seere
1739 John Watson
1743 James Tappenden
1745 Isaac Jones
1749 Edward Jacob
1754 Edward Jacob
1765 Edward Jacob
1775 Edward Jacob
1857 R.J. Hilton
1865 J.H. Fielding
1866 J.A. Anderson
1870 J.H. Fielding
1872 R. Watson-Smith
1873 L. Shrubsole
1876 J.A. Anderson
1877 L. Shrubsole
1878 L. Shrubsole
1880 L. Shrubsole
1881 E. Smith
1882 J.A. Anderson
1884 L. Shrubsole
1885 L. Shrubsole
1889 H.R. Child
1891 E. Holmes
1892 E. Smith
1899: Charles Cremer, brick manufacturer 
1901-02: Councillor F. Austin, who was one of the representatives of the Cinque Ports at the Coronation of King Edward VII and Queen Alexandra.
1902-03: Jabez Smith
1907-09: Charles Cremer
1948-50: Harry Knowles, greengrocer, awarded honorary freedom of Faversham.
1991-1992: Bryan Mulhern (1952 - 2020)
1996-1998: Kate Lee
1998-1999: Chris Perkin
1999-2000: Patrick Mulcahy

21st Century

2000–01: Chris Perkin (born c.1955)
2001–03: Thomas "Tom" Gates
2003–05: Cynthia "Cindy" Davies
2005–06: Michael Gates
2006–08: Trevor Fentiman
2008–10: Ted Wilcox
2010–12: Anita Walker
2012–14: David Simmons
2014–16: Nigel Kay
2016-18: Shiel Campbell
2018-19: Trevor Abram
2019-2022: Alison Reynolds
2022-present Trevor Martin

References

 Faversham
History of Kent
Kent-related lists
Faversham
Faversham